The Paris Gun was the name given to a type of German long-range siege gun, several of which were used to bombard Paris during World War I. They were in service from March to August 1918. When the guns were first employed, Parisians believed they had been bombed by a high-altitude Zeppelin, as the sound of neither an airplane nor a gun could be heard. They were the largest pieces of artillery used during the war by barrel length, and qualify under the (later) formal definition of large-calibre artillery.
Also called the "Kaiser Wilhelm Geschütz" ("Kaiser Wilhelm Gun"), they were often confused with Big Bertha, the German howitzer used against Belgian forts in the Battle of Liège in 1914; indeed, the French called them by this name as well. They were also confused with the smaller "Langer Max" (Long Max) cannon, from which they were derived; although the famous Krupp-family artillery makers produced all these guns, the resemblance ended there.

As military weapons, the Paris Guns were not a great success: the payload was small, the barrel required frequent replacement, and the guns' accuracy was good enough for only city-sized targets. The German objective was to build a psychological weapon to attack the morale of the Parisians, not to destroy the city itself.

Description

Due to the weapon's apparent total destruction by the Germans in the face of the final Entente offensives, its capabilities are not known with full certainty. Figures stated for the weapon's size, range, and performance varied widely depending on the source—not even the number of shells fired is certain. In the 1980's a long note on the gun was discovered and published. This was written by Dr. Fritz Rausenberger (in German), the Krupp engineer in charge of the gun's development, shortly before his death in 1926. Thanks to this, the details of the gun's design and capabilities were considerably clarified.

The distance was so far that the Coriolis effect—the rotation of the Earth—was substantial enough to affect trajectory calculations. The gun was fired at an azimuth of 232 degrees (west-southwest) from Crépy-en-Laon, which was at a latitude of 49.5 degrees north.

Seven barrels were constructed. This smooth section was intended to improve accuracy and reduce the dispersion of the shells, as it reduced the slight yaw a shell might have immediately after leaving the gun barrel produced by the gun's rifling. The barrel was braced to counteract barrel drop due to its length and weight, and vibrations while firing; it was mounted on a special rail-transportable carriage and fired from a prepared, concrete emplacement with a turntable. The original breech of the old 38 cm gun did not require modification or reinforcement.

Since it was based on a naval weapon, the gun was manned by a crew of 80 Imperial Navy sailors under the command of Vice-Admiral Maximilian Rogge, chief of the Ordnance branch of the Admiralty. It was surrounded by several batteries of standard army artillery to create a "noise-screen" chorus around the big gun so that it could not be located by French and British spotters.

The projectile flew significantly higher than projectiles from previous guns. This was by far the highest point ever reached by a man-made object, so high that gunners, in calculating where the shells would land, had to take into account the rotation of the Earth. For the first time in warfare, deadly projectiles rained down on civilians from the stratosphere".

The unfinished V-3 cannon would have been able to fire larger projectiles to a longer range, and with a substantially higher rate of fire. The unfinished Iraqi super gun would also have been substantially bigger.

Projectiles

The main body of the shell was composed of thick steel, containing  of TNT.

The small amount of explosive – around 6.6% of the weight of the shell – meant that the effect of its shellburst was small for the shell's size. The thickness of the shell casing, to withstand the forces of firing, meant that shells would explode into a comparatively small number of large fragments, limiting their destructive effect.

The shells were propelled at such a high velocity that each successive shot wore away a considerable amount of steel from the rifled bore. Each shell was sequentially numbered according to its increasing diameter, and had to be fired in numeric order, lest the projectile lodge in the bore and the gun explode. Also, when the shell was rammed into the gun, the chamber was precisely measured to determine the difference in its length: a few inches off would cause a great variance in the velocity, and with it, the range. Then, with the variance determined, the additional quantity of propellant was calculated, and its measure taken from a special car and added to the regular charge. After 65 rounds had been fired, each of progressively larger caliber to allow for wear, the barrel was sent back to Krupp and rebored with a new set of shells.

The shell's explosive was contained in two compartments, separated by a wall. This strengthened the shell and supported the explosive charge under the acceleration of firing. One of the shell's two fuzes was mounted in the wall, with the other in the base of the shell. The fuzes proved very reliable as every single one of the 303 shells that landed in and around Paris successfully detonated.

The shell's nose was fitted with a streamlined, lightweight, ballistic cap and the side had grooves that engaged with the rifling of the gun barrel, spinning the shell as it was fired so its flight was stable. Two copper driving bands provided a gas-tight seal against the gun barrel during firing.

Use in World War I

The gun was fired from a wooded hill (Le mont de Joie) near Crépy, and the first shell landed at 7:18 a.m. on 23 March 1918 on the Quai de la Seine, the explosion being heard across the city. Shells continued to land at 15-minute intervals, with 21 counted on the first day. On the first day, fifteen people were killed and thirty-six wounded. The effect on morale in Paris was immediate: by 27 March, queues of thousands had started at the Gare d'Orsay and, at the Gare Montparnasse, ticket sales out of the capital were suspended due to demand.

The initial assumption was these were bombs dropped from an airplane or Zeppelin flying too high to be seen or heard. Within a few hours, sufficient casing fragments had been collected to show that the explosions were the result of shells, not bombs. By the end of the day, military authorities were aware the shells were being fired from behind German lines by a new long-range gun, although there was initial press speculation on the origin of the shells. This included the theory they were being fired by German agents close by Paris, or even within the city itself, so abandoned quarries close to the city were searched for a hidden gun. 
Three emplacements for the gun were located within days by the French reconnaissance pilot Didier Daurat, the path of the shells which landed in Paris having revealed the direction from which they were being fired. The closest emplacement was engaged by a 34 cm railway gun while the other two sites were bombed by aircraft, although this failed to interrupt the German bombardment.

Between 320 and 367 shells were fired, at a maximum rate of around 20 per day. The shells killed 250 people and wounded 620, and caused considerable damage to property. The worst incident was on 29 March 1918, when a shell hit the roof of the St-Gervais-et-St-Protais Church, collapsing the roof onto the congregation then hearing the Good Friday service.  A total of 91 people were killed and 68 were wounded. There was no firing between 25 and 29 March, when the first barrel was being replaced; an unconfirmed intelligence report claimed that it had exploded. Barrels were probably changed again between 7-11 April and again between 21-24 April. The diameter of the later shells increased from 21 to 24 cm, indicating that the used barrels had been re-bored.
 

The gun was taken back to Germany in August 1918 as Allied advances threatened its security. No guns were ever captured by the Allies. It is believed that near the end of the war they were completely destroyed by the Germans. One spare mounting was captured by American troops in Bruyères-sur-Fère, near Château-Thierry, but the gun was never found; the construction plans seem to have been destroyed as well.

After World War I

Under the terms of the Treaty of Versailles, the Germans were required to turn over a complete Paris Gun to the Allies, but they never complied with this.

In the 1930s, the German Army became interested in rockets for long-range artillery as a replacement for the Paris Gun—which was specifically banned under the Versailles Treaty. This work eventually led to the V-2 rocket that was used in World War II.

Despite the ban, Krupp continued theoretical work on long-range guns. They started experimental work after the Nazi government began funding the project upon coming to power in 1933. This research led to the 21 cm K 12 (E), a refinement of the Paris Gun design concept. Although it was broadly similar in size and range to its predecessor, Krupp's engineers had significantly reduced the problem of barrel wear. They also improved mobility over the fixed Paris Gun by making the K12 a railway gun.

The first K12 was delivered to the German Army in 1939 and a second in 1940. During World War II, they were deployed in the Nord-Pas-de-Calais region of France; they were used to shell Kent in Southern England between late 1940 and early 1941. One gun was captured by Allied forces in the Netherlands in 1945.

In popular culture

A parody of the Paris Gun appears in the Charlie Chaplin movie The Great Dictator.  Firing at the Cathedral of Notre Dame, the "Tomanians" (the fictional country that represented Germany) succeed in blowing up a small outhouse.

The destruction of the St-Gervais-et-St-Protais Church inspired Romain Rolland to write his novel Pierre et Luce.

See also
 Krupp K5, a 283 mm, World War II German gun with a  range.

Notes

References

Bibliography

 Henry W. Miller, Railway Artillery: A Report on the Characteristics, Scope of Utility, etc. of Railway Artillery, United States Government Printing Office, 1921
 Henry W. Miller, The Paris Gun: The Bombardment of Paris by the German Long Range Guns and the Great German Offensive of 1918, Jonathan Cape, Harrison Smith, New York, 1930
 
 Ian V. Hogg, The Guns 1914 -18, Ballantine Books, New York, 1971

External links

 The Paris Gun in the First World War.com Encyclopedia
 Paris Gun at S. Berliner, III's ORDNANCE Superguns
 Une page sur le canon de Paris

210 mm artillery
Siege artillery
World War I railway artillery of Germany
Lost objects
1918 in Paris